Domenico Mordini (7 April 1898 – 12 March 1948) was an Italian sailor who competed in the 1936 Summer Olympics.

In 1936 he was a crew member of the Italian boat Italia which won the gold medal in the 8 metre class competition.

References

External links
 
 
 
 

1898 births
1948 deaths
Italian male sailors (sport)
Olympic sailors of Italy
Olympic gold medalists for Italy
Olympic medalists in sailing
Sailors at the 1936 Summer Olympics – 8 Metre
Medalists at the 1936 Summer Olympics